GSC 03089-00929 is a magnitude 12 star located approximately 760 light-years away in the constellation of Hercules. This star is a G type main sequence star that is similar to but slightly cooler than the Sun.
This star is identified in SIMBAD as a variable star per the 1SWASP survey.

The star GSC 03089-00929 is named Pipoltr. The name was selected in the NameExoWorlds campaign by Liechtenstein, during the 100th anniversary of the IAU. In the local dialect of Triesenberg, Pipoltr is a bright and visible butterfly.

Planetary system
In 2007 the TrES program found exoplanet TrES-3b orbiting this star by using the transit method.

The transit timing variation analysis did not reveal any additional planets in the system as of 2020, and the physical mechanism underlying transit timing variations remains unexplained as in 2022.

See also
 List of extrasolar planets
 SuperWASP

References

External links
 Massive Transiting Planet With 31-hour Year Found Around Distant Star
 TrES-3 light curve using differential photometry
 

Hercules (constellation)
Planetary transit variables
Planetary systems with one confirmed planet
G-type main-sequence stars
Herculis, V1434